S7 Airlines, legally JSC Siberia Airlines ("АО Aviakompania Sibir"), is an airline headquartered in Ob, Novosibirsk Oblast, Russia, with offices in Moscow. As of 2008, it was Russia's largest domestic airline, with its main bases at Domodedovo International Airport and Tolmachevo Airport. It is a member of the Oneworld alliance but its membership is currently suspended due to Russia's invasion of Ukraine.

History

Early years

What is now S7 Airlines started in 1957 as "the Tolmachevo united squadron" of the General Directorate of Civil Aviation of the Soviet Union. After the Soviet Union disintegration and during the 1990s Russian economic reforms, a state-run Siberia Airlines was created based on the squadron in 1992 and later privatized in 1994. The same year Siberia was assigned an IATA airline code.

In 1997, Siberia Airlines tried to buy Vnukovo Airlines, to make Moscow its next main hub, but the purchase did not proceed. After the 1998 Russian financial crisis, Vnukovo Airlines was heading towards bankruptcy, and Siberia Airlines offered to merge the two airlines, but Vnukovo refused. In 1999, Siberia Airlines signed a document offering to take over Vnukovo Airlines, in the event Vnukovo ceased operations due to insolvency.

Development since the 2000s

Siberia Airlines began merging with Vnukovo Airlines in 2001. The same year, the airline absorbed Baikal Airlines and then in 2004, the airline absorbed Chelyabinsk Airlines and Enkor. 

The first non-Russian aircraft, Airbus A310s, were acquired in 2004. In summer 2004, during the Farnborough Airshow, the company signed a memorandum of understanding to purchase fifty Sukhoi Superjet 100s, with the first to be delivered in 2007. However, the airline subsequently dropped its plans to order this aircraft, citing that the aircraft's changed specifications no longer met its requirements.

Siberia Airlines rebranded itself as S7 Airlines in 2005.

In line with an International Air Transport Association (IATA) resolution, from December 2006 the airline began to publish its fares for international destinations originating in Russia in euros, rather than US dollars. This resulted in a fare increase, as the conversion rate used was 1 euro = 1 US dollar. Fuel surcharges were also published in euros. Its domestic fares were still to be shown in the local currency. Also in December 2006, the airline became the second Russian air carrier to complete, and pass, the IATA Operational Safety Audit, which is the first global air safety standard.

In April 2007 S7 announced that it had set up a new division, called Globus. This division was to focus on charter flights for tourists to foreign holiday destinations. Initially, the aircraft for this division would be drawn from the mainline fleet, but during 2010–2014, ten Boeing 737-800 aircraft were leased with an all-economy layout, with the option for a further ten aircraft.

S7 joined the Oneworld airline alliance in 2010.

In November 2015, S7 Airlines offered to acquire a majority stake in the bankrupt Transaero; the proposal was subsequently rejected by shareholders.

In 2016, the American band OK Go partnered with S7 to film a "zero-g" music video for their song "Upside Down & Inside Out", aboard a reduced gravity aircraft.

On 28 August 2018, S7 it would invest $192.87 million in a new manufacturing plant in Moscow, part of its Victory business plan. In December 2018, a few months after the completion of its purchase of Sea Launch the parent holding company was renamed S7 AirSpace Corporation to reflect the transition from an aviation-only business.

On 31 March 2019, chairwoman and co-owner Natalia Fileva died after the Epic LT private plane she was in crashed while landing at Frankfurt Egelsbach Airport. In August 2019, S7 Airlines announced it was collecting donations for Siberian forests damaged by massive fires. The airline decided use a hybrid-retro livery on one of its Airbus A320-200 to the hybrid-retro livery, underlining its previous name and current callsign: Siberia Airlines. The livery is a combination of one from 1992-2005 and one from 2017-today. Also in August 2019, the airline announced that S7 Airlines and Globus Airlines would merge by December 2019, ending Globus´ operations. By early December 2019, the merger had been completed.

In February 2022, as a result of the Russian invasion of Ukraine, S7 and other Russian airlines were banned from EU airspace and that of other countries. This led to S7 suspending operations in Europe on 25 February 2022 and a suspension of all international flights by 5 March 2022. The owner of aircraft leased to S7 Airlines, AerCap is seeking to repossess their aircraft. In July 2022, S7 announced a halt to all plans for its new low-cost subsidiary Citrus due to the required aircraft not being delivered.

In September 2022, S7 reached an agreement to hand back its leased Boeing 737 MAX to their lessor. The aircraft will be transferred via a neutral country.

Financial and operational performance 
There are financial and operational performance S7 Airlines starting from 2011:

Destinations 

S7 Airlines operates to almost 150 destinations domestically within Russia and internationally throughout Europe and Asia.

Codeshare agreements
S7 has codeshare agreements with the following airlines:

 Aegean Airlines
 Air Astana
 Air Moldova
 Asiana Airlines
 Azerbaijan Airlines
 Belavia
 British Airways
 Cathay Pacific
 Cyprus Airways
 El Al
 Emirates
 Hainan Airlines
 Iberia
 Japan Airlines
 NordStar
 Qatar Airways
 Royal Air Maroc
 Royal Jordanian
 Singapore Airlines
 TAP Air Portugal
 Uzbekistan Airways 
 Yamal Airlines

Fleet

Current fleet

, the S7 Airlines fleet consists of the following aircraft:

Fleet development
On 29 May 2007, the airline announced a proposed order for fifteen Boeing 787 Dreamliners scheduled for delivery in 2014, with an option for ten additional aircraft. However, the order was officially cancelled on 29 January 2009, with S7 stating that it was considering the possibility of taking the aircraft under a leasing scheme. As of November 2008, all Soviet-made aircraft had left the fleet.

In April 2018, S7 renewed interest in the Sukhoi Superjet by planning to purchase 25 Sukhoi Superjet 75 aircraft, with an option of 50 more for the new modification of the Superjet family, and become the launch customer. These will replace the airline's aging Embraer 170 aircraft. The airline plans to take deliveries of this aircraft from 2023. However in September 2019, it was announced the project had been scrapped.

In October 2018, the airline took delivery of its first Boeing 737 MAX 8 and became the Russian launch customer of the aircraft type.

Retired fleet
At different times, the S7 Airlines fleet has consisted of the following aircraft:

Incidents and accidents
On 4 October 2001, Siberia Airlines Flight 1812, a Tupolev Tu-154M, registration RA-85693, en route from Tel Aviv to Novosibirsk crashed into the Black Sea off Sochi, after being hit with a S-200V surface-to-air missile launched as part of a Ukrainian Air Defense exercise staged off Cape Opuk (or Chuluk) in Crimea. All 78 people on board were killed.
On 24 August 2004, Siberia Airlines Flight 1047, a Tupolev Tu-154B2, registration RA-85556, en route from Moscow to Sochi exploded and crashed due to a terrorist bombing near Rostov-on-Don, Russia, killing all 46 people on board.
On 9 July 2006, S7 Airlines Flight 778, an Airbus A310 carrying 193 passengers and 10 crew members, suffered a landing accident at Irkutsk International Airport in Siberia. The jet failed to decelerate on landing, overran the runway and crashed into a concrete barricade; 125 people died.
 In August 2020, Russian politician Alex Navalny was flying to Moscow on S7 airlines. He was posioned by Russian police and became ill. When the plane landed in Moscow he was transferred to an ambulance. He was later treated in Germany. 
On 2 December 2021, S7 Airlines Flight 5220, an Airbus A321-271N made an emergency landing at Irkutsk International Airport due to severe icing which led to reduced controllability. The flight suffered from rapid pitch oscillations for 7 minutes. After control was regained the flight diverted to Irkutsk, where all 209 people on board exited injury-free.

Subsidiaries
S7 Technics is a subsidiary of S7, located on the grounds of Tolmachevo Airport.

See also

 Babyflot
 List of airlines of Russia
 Transport in Russia

References

External links

Official website 

Airlines established in 1957
Airlines established in 1992
Airlines of Russia
Former Aeroflot divisions
Oneworld
Russian brands
1957 establishments in the Soviet Union
Russian companies established in 1992
Companies based in Novosibirsk